Kupiškis is a city in northeastern Lithuania. It is the capital of the Kupiškis district municipality, mainly known for its sculptures and fourth biggest water reservoir in Lithuania. Kupiškis is located on the Lėvuo and Kupa rivers. The name of the city comes from the Kupa River. The Gediminas Bridge crosses the Kupa River. There are six parts of the city, which are named:
 Centras (Center or Old Town; the oldest buildings in the city, town hall, sanitation and utility buildings, library, church, high school, blocks of flats, detached houses)
 Krantinė (high-rise housing complex between 4 and 5 floors, detached houses, shopping malls, preschool, primary school)
 Kraštiečiai (high-rise housing complex between 2 and 6 floors, shopping malls, preschool)
 Račiupėnai (a residential area; detached houses, middle school, business and technological school, bus station)
 Zuntė (a residential area; detached houses)
 Pramoninė teritorija (Industrial district; factories, warehouses, train station)

History 

Archeological finds provide evidence that even in the 3rd and 2nd centuries BC people dwelt in the surroundings of Kupiškis. However, there is no information on when the very settlement was founded. The findings around the Aukštupėnai mound show that in the 8th century a wooden defence castle stood there.

Kupiškis was mentioned in historical sources for the first time in 1529. It was a property of Sigismund I the Old, the ruler of the Grand Duchy of Lithuania. From 1561 to 1565 it was a center of small ruler's center, belonging to the Upytė district and later the Ukmergė district. At that time the main road from Vilnius to Riga led via Kupiškis.

In 1616, the first Catholic church was built in Kupiškis. In 1781, the first school of the Lankasteriai family was established. The railway line from Daugavpils to Šiauliai to Liepāja was built in 1873.

Population 

According to the Department of Statistics of Lithuania, the population of Kupiškis as of January 1, 2005 was 8,243. The ethnic composition of the Kupiškis district municipality, according to the 2001 census, was:

23,965 (97.3%) Lithuanians
430 (1.7%) Russians
64 (0.3%) Poles
49 (0.2%) Ukrainians
38 (0.2%) Belarusians
82 (0.3%) Other nationalities

Jews in Kupiškis 

Kupiškis, known in Yiddish as Kupishok or Kupishik, was home to 1,444 Jews before World War II. The Jewish population basically constituted about 42% of the town's population.  In the summer of 1941, all of the Jewish men, women, and children in the town were herded into a makeshift ghetto and tormented for about two days, and starved of food and were denied even water, and were then marched in groups to a cemetery reserved for atheists, where they were shot and buried in unmarked pits.  In the aftermath of the war, Christian midwives from the Jewish Hospital in Panevezys compiled a list of more than 800 names of the murdered Jews. However, historians estimate that 1,500 to 2,000 Jews were killed by the Nazi and their collaborators "Kupiškis self-defense unit".

A German national named Werner Loew, who had been pretending to be a communist, while teaching the German language at the local gymnasium in Kupiskis, decided to seize control of the town in July 1941 and became the self appointed "commandant" of the town. He had then engaged the services of a small band of deserting soldiers who were part of the Soviet Red Army's 618th artillery unit, who had previously been deployed to Kupiskis in 1940. These Lithuanian former soldiers of the Red Army, were led by Lieutenant Antanas Gudelis, who later became the commander of a unit of executioners under Loew's personal direction.

The Great Synagogue in Kupiškis was built of stone.  The red brick portion was a Misnagdim Synagogue.  The Great Synagogue was used as the "Culture House" during the Soviet period.  The Misnagdim portion is now used as a boiler room for heating the main building which now contains the Public Library and Wall of Memory Holocaust Memorial erected on July 13, 2004. The Memorial dedication service was initiated and attended by Jewish descendants of the residents of Kupiskis. They held a worship service, the first since the destruction of the Jewish community in 1941, in the library which was once the synagogue. Rabbi Michael Mayersohn of Orange County, CA, whose paternal grandparents had lived in Kupiskis, led the historic worship service.

Amongst the many Jewish families from Kupiskis who were murdered by the Nazis and their collaborators was the Kacevas family, of which six family members were wiped out in one particular action. A detailed list compiled by the Christian midwives of the known Jewish victims bares testimony to the heinous nature of these and many other murders of the members unfortunate Jewish community, amongst whom were many children. The date for this particular action was the 28th of June 1941.

The names of the Jewish victims who were murdered in this one particular action which lasted for two days, are contained on this list, and are reflected on the Wall of Memory Holocaust Memorial in the foyer of the former Misnagdim Synagogue, which is now the public library building.

Some non Jewish residents of the town, such as Dr Franzkevicius tried to hide and protect some Jewish residents, however unfortunately none of those who were being protected survived.

Educational institutions

Schools 

Kupiškis Laurynas Stuoka-Gucevičius gymnasium (High School) (for students from 14 to 18)
Kupiškis Povilas Matulionis progymnasium (for students from 6 to 14)
Kupiškis Technological And Business School (for students from 16 to 21)

Art schools 
Kupiškis Arts School

Preschools 
Varpelis
Obelėlė
Saulutė

Sport 
 FC Kupiškis football club;
 Kupiškio centrinis stadionas.

Twin towns – sister cities

Kupiškis is twinned with:

 Balvi, Latvia
 Jēkabpils Municipality, Latvia
 Kežmarok, Slovakia
 Lanchkhuti, Georgia
 Manevychi Raion, Ukraine
 Rēzekne Municipality, Latvia
 Sztum, Poland
 Zgierz, Poland

Notable people 
 Laurynas Gucevičius, a Polish-Lithuanian architect, was born in the village of Migonys near Kupiškis.

References

External links 

 Virtual Tour of Kupiškis
  Kupiškis district municipality official site 
  Kupiskis JewishGen ShtetLinks site
  Kupiškis City photos on Miestai.net

 
Cities in Lithuania
Cities in Panevėžys County
Municipalities administrative centres of Lithuania
Vilkomirsky Uyezd
Holocaust locations in Lithuania
Kupiškis District Municipality